McCartney is a surname of Irish and Scottish origin. It is derived from the Gaelic Mac Cartaine, composed of the element Artan meaning "the Bear". It is not to be confused with McCarthy (Irish: Mac Cárthaigh), which has different origins.

Originally from Ireland, the Macartney Kerns were a branch of the great family of MacCarthy Mór of Munster, who were Kings of Cork and Princes of Desmond. The fifth son of Cormac Fionn (d. 1248) was Donogh Cartnach who is the ancestor of the kerns. Donough Cartnach left 2 sons, the eldest Donal joined Edward Bruce (King of Ireland), brother of Robert the Bruce (King of Scotland). For serving under Robert the Bruce’s standard, Donal received a grant of land in Argyll, called ‘Glen Artney’ (grid 56.22 degrees North 4.0 degrees West) from the King of Scotland.

Some of Donal’s descendants later moved to Galloway and settled in Auchinleck in Kirkcudbright, Scotland. In Auchinleck in 1522 a George Macartney married Margaret McCulloch. Their grandson, Bartholomew McCartney had one child, George Macartney (b. 1626). This George Macartney emigrated to Ulster from Scotland. He is the original ancestor of many of the families of Macartney in Ulster and Ireland including that of George Macartney, 1st Earl Macartney. He bought the property of Lissanoure in 1649 near Cloughmills, Co. Antrim.

People 
 Andrew McCartney, Scottish footballer
 Bill McCartney (born 1940), American evangelist and former football coach
 Billy McCartney (born 1947), Scottish footballer
 Brandon McCartney ("Lil B"), American rapper
 Branville McCartney (born 1967), Bahamian politician
 Clarence Edward Noble Macartney, a conservative Presbyterian pastor and author
 Daniel McCartney (1817–1887), mental calculator
 Dave McCartney (footballer) (1875–1949), Scottish footballer
 Edith Hyde Robbins Macartney (1895–1978), first Miss America
 Edward Henry Macartney (1863–1956) solicitor and politician in Queensland
 Eliza McCartney, New Zealand pole vaulter
 Forrest S. McCartney, American general and NASA manager
 Frederic O. MacCartney (1864–1903), Massachusetts socialist politician
 George Macartney, 1st Earl Macartney (1737–1806), British statesman, colonial administrator and diplomat
 George McCartney, Northern Ireland footballer
 George McCartney (British consul), British consul-general in Kashgar in China at the end of the nineteenth century
 Halliday Macartney, British military surgeon and civil servant for the Qing Dynasty
 Harold McCartney, English former professional rugby league footballer
 Hussey Macartney (1879–1894), Dean of St. Paul's Cathedral, Melbourne
 Ian McCartney, Canadian political essayist and baseball enthusiast
 Innes McCartney, nautical archaeologist, author and television contributor
 Jesse McCartney, (born 1987) American pop singer, songwriter, actor, and voice actor.
 John Ellison-Macartney, (1818–1904) Irish politician
 Sir John Macartney, 1st Baronet (died 1812), Irish politician and first of the Macartney baronets
 John McCartney (footballer born 1866) (1866–1933), Scottish player and manager
 John McCartney (footballer born 1870) (1870–1942), Scottish player for Liverpool
 Joseph H. McCartney (1943–1992), poet and artist
 Mike McCartney (footballer) (born 1954), Scottish footballer, formerly manager of Gretna FC
 Paul McCartney (born 1942), English singer/songwriter with bands The Beatles and Wings
 Mike McCartney (born 1944), Paul McCartney's brother, singer and photographer
 Linda McCartney (1941–1998), American musician and photographer, Paul McCartney's first wife
 Heather McCartney (born 1962), Linda McCartney's daughter, adopted by Paul McCartney
 Mary McCartney (born 1969), British photographer, Paul and Linda McCartney's daughter
 Stella McCartney (born 1971), British fashion designer, Paul and Linda McCartney's daughter
 James McCartney (born 1977), British musician, Paul and Linda McCartney's son
 John McCartney, fictional grandfather of Paul McCartney, played by Wilfrid Brambell in A Hard Day's Night (film)
 Paula McCartney (born 1971), American artist
 Raymond McCartney, Northern Ireland politician
 Robert McCartney (Australian politician) (1906–1978)
 Robert McCartney (Northern Irish politician) (born 1936), Northern Irish unionist politician
 Robert McCartney (1971–2005), victim of a 2005 murder in Northern Ireland
 Scott Macartney, American alpine skier
 Tim Macartney-Snape, Australian mountain climber
 Tom McCartney, New Zealand Rugby player
 William Ellison-Macartney, Governor of Tasmania and Western Australia
 William McCartney (footballer), Scottish footballer
 Willie McCartney (died 1948), Scottish football manager

Ulaid